Ankarangona is a town and commune in Madagascar. It belongs to the district of Antsiranana II, which is a part of Diana Region. According to 2001 census the population of Ankarangona was 5,610.

Only primary schooling is available in town. The majority 95% of the population are farmers, while an additional 3.5% receives their livelihood from raising livestock. The most important crops are rice and tomatoes; also cucumber is an important agricultural product. Services provide employment for 0.5% of the population. Additionally fishing employs 1% of the population.

Attractions
The Tsingy Rouge are in this municipality.

References and notes 

Populated places in Diana Region